Anambe or Anambé may refer to:
 Anambé people, an ethnic group of Brazil
 Anambé language, a language of Pará, Brazil
 Anambé of Ehrenreich, an extinct language of Maranhão, Brazil

See also 
 Amambai

Language and nationality disambiguation pages